Dudhi or Duddhi is a town and ( Proposed district )& Nagar panchayat in Sonbhadra district  in the state of Uttar Pradesh, India. It belongs to Mirzapur Division . It is located 64 km south of the district capital, Robertsganj. Dudhi is a tehsil of sonebhadra district. Renukoot, Anpara, Obra, Robertsganj are the nearby Cities to Dudhi. Dudhinagar-Renukoot is demanded district by dudhinagar people. There are many places to visit and enjoy natural beauty and environment of this town. This has hidden tourism site as locals have named one site as "Mini Goa" people visit this place to celebrate New year. Locals are very friendly.

The market place  consists of showrooms of various companies like Home Decor, Rajgharana, Honda Bikes, Sonalika Tractors, Somany Tiles, Bajaj Motorcycles, MRF Tyres and Jewellery shops.

Demographics
 India census, Dudhi tehsil had a population of 159,001 and Dudhi town had a population of 12,560. Males constitute 54% of the population and females 46%. Duddhi has an average literacy rate of 67%. Male literacy is 74% and, female literacy is 58%. In Duddhi, 17% of the population is under 6 years of age.

Transport

Air
Duddhi is located about 154 km from the city of Varanasi, which has also the nearest airport. Flights are available to all major Indian cities including Delhi, Mumbai, Kolkata, Lucknow, Agra, Bangalore, Chennai, Patna, Khajuraho, Hyderabad, Gaya etc. International connections are Bangkok, Colombo, Hong Kong, Mecca and Kathmandu.

Rail

The Duddhinagar railway station connects Delhi, Jammu, Allahabad, Ranchi, Tatanagar, Lucknow, Bareilly, Kolkata and Kanpur by rail. Some notable trains passing through the town are

 Muri Express (Jammu Tawi - Delhi - Tata Nagar)
 Triveni Express (Bareilly - Lucknow - Shaktinagar)
 Singrauli - Patna Link Express (Singrauli - Patna)
 Shaktipunj Express (Howrah - Jabalpur)

Road

Duddhi is well connected to Renukoot, Robertsganj, Varanasi and Mirzapur by road. Buses are available at all hours of the day from Hathinala to connect with other nearest cities.

References

Cities and towns in Sonbhadra district